State Route 600 (SR 600) is an east–west state highway in the northwestern portion of the U.S. state of Ohio.

Route description

All of SR 600 exists within the confines of Sandusky County, though at the western terminus, US 23 straddles the Sandusky–Wood County boundary.  This highway is not included within the National Highway System, a system of highways deemed most important for the country's economy, defense and mobility.

History
SR 600 was first designated in 1937 along the routing that it maintains today between US 23 and US 20.  No significant changes have taken place to the routing of the state highway since its inception.

Major intersections

References

600
Transportation in Sandusky County, Ohio